Eusèbe Roberge (3 June 1874 – 10 April 1957) was a Liberal party member of the House of Commons of Canada. He was born in Laurierville, Quebec and became a merchant.

Roberge attended the Collège de Levis.

He was acclaimed to Parliament at the Mégantic riding in a by-election on 20 November 1922 then re-elected in 1925, 1926 and 1930. With riding changes, Roberge was re-elected in 1935 when his riding became Mégantic—Frontenac. After completing his term in the 18th Canadian Parliament, Roberge did not seek another term in the 1940 federal election.

References

External links
 

1874 births
1957 deaths
Canadian merchants
Liberal Party of Canada MPs
Members of the House of Commons of Canada from Quebec